B10, B X or B-10 may refer to:

 Big Ten Conference
 B10 (1930s New York City bus) serving Brooklyn
 B10 road (Cyprus)
 B10 cell, a lymphocyte type
 B10 biodiesel blend: 10% biodiesel, 90% petrodiesel is labeled B10
 B-10 motorway (Spain), a ring motorway around Barcelona
 B-10 recoilless rifle, a rifle used by the Soviet Army
 Bavarian B X, an 1890 German locomotive model
 Bensen B-10, a 1958 American unconventional aircraft 
 Bundesstraße 10, a federal highway in Germany
 , a British B-class submarine
 Martin B-10, a US bomber
 B10 when relating to Functional Safety, the number of operations that a devices will operate prior to 10% of a sample of those devices would fail. B10d is the same calculation, but where 10% of the sample would fail to danger.
 10 amp, type B – a standard circuit breaker current rating
 Caro-Kann Defence, an Encyclopaedia of Chess Openings designation
 An international standard paper size, defined in ISO 216
 B-10 or H-10, a Boxer engine or horizontally opposed 10-cylinder internal combustion engine configuration
 Boron-10, a stable isotope of boron

See also
10B (disambiguation)